Agios Pavlos is a village in the Limassol District of Cyprus, located 4 km east of Kalo Chorio.

References

Communities in Limassol District